Thomas Lloyd (b Dolgellau 1709 - d Bangor 1793)  was Dean of Bangor from 1753 to 1793.

Lloyd was educated at Ruthin School and Trinity College, Cambridge. He was Precentor of Bangor Cathedral from 1744 to 1748; and its Treasurer from then until his appointment to the deanery.

References

People educated at Ruthin School
People from Dolgellau
Alumni of Trinity College, Cambridge
18th-century Welsh Anglican priests
1793 deaths
Deans of Bangor
1709 births